Noah Cameron Schnapp (born October 3, 2004) is an American actor. He gained recognition for playing Will Byers in the Netflix science fiction horror series Stranger Things. His film roles include Roger Donovan in Steven Spielberg's historical drama Bridge of Spies (2015) and the voice of Charlie Brown in the animated The Peanuts Movie (2015).

Early life and education

Schnapp was born in New York City to Mitchell and Karine Schnapp (née Perez), and was raised in Scarsdale, New York. He is Jewish and had his Bar Mitzvah in Israel. He has a twin sister. He holds both U.S. and Canadian citizenship. His father is of Russian Jewish descent, while his mother is of Moroccan Jewish descent.

Schnapp's desire to act started when he was about five years old after watching the Broadway production of Annie. He performed acting roles in school and community plays. When he was 8, his acting teacher suggested he attempt a professional career. Schnapp's parents enrolled him in an acting program at Westchester's Star Kidz with coach Alyson Isbrandtsen who soon referred him to MKS&D Talent Management for career opportunities.

Schnapp attends the Wharton School of the University of Pennsylvania, majoring in entrepreneurship and innovation. He is scheduled to graduate in 2026.

Career

Acting 
Schnapp's acting debut was in the Academy Award-winning 2015 film Bridge of Spies, directed by Steven Spielberg. He played Roger, the son of character James B. Donovan. Concurrently, Schnapp voiced the lead character, Charlie Brown, in the animated movie The Peanuts Movie. He also voiced the character for the video game The Peanuts Movie: Snoopy's Grand Adventure.

His breakthrough came in July 2016, when he began starring as Will Byers in the Netflix science fiction horror television series Stranger Things. He was promoted to series regular for the second season of the series, which premiered on October 27, 2017. Schnapp also starred in independent films like Abe (2019) and Waiting for Anya (2020). He appeared in the 2020 Halloween comedy film Hubie Halloween. In April 2022, Schnapp joined the cast of The Tutor.

Other ventures 
In 2019, he launched a YouTube channel under his own name. Active for a year and a half, he primarily created vlogs and lifestyle videos. As of June 2022, the channel has 4.2million subscribers and has gained 110million views.

In November 2021, Schnapp launched To Be Honest (TBH), a sustainability-focused snacking company. In November 2022, Schnapp announced a crowdfunding campaign for this venture on the Republic platform that aimed to raise a maximum amount of $1.235million at a $15million valuation cap.

Personal life
Schnapp publicly came out as gay in a video posted to his TikTok account on January 5, 2023. The video saw him express relief that family and friends had accepted his coming out, and he quipped in the video's caption "I guess I'm more similar to Will [Byers] than I thought", referring to his statement about his Stranger Things character also being gay.

Filmography

Film

Television

Music videos

Awards and nominations

References

External links
 

2004 births
Living people
21st-century American Jews
21st-century American male actors
American gay actors
American male child actors
American male film actors
American male stage actors
American male television actors
American male voice actors
American people of Moroccan-Jewish descent
American people of Russian-Jewish descent
Jewish American male actors
LGBT Jews
LGBT people from New York (state)